Glasgow Prestwick Airport, commonly referred to as Prestwick Airport, is an international airport serving the west of Scotland, situated  northeast of the town of Prestwick in South Ayrshire and  southwest of Glasgow. It is the less busy of the two airports serving the western part of Scotland's Central Belt, after Glasgow Int’l Airport in Renfrewshire, within the Greater Glasgow conurbation. The airport serves the urban cluster surrounding Ayr, including: Kilmarnock, Irvine, Ardrossan, Troon, Saltcoats, Stevenston, Kilwinning, and Prestwick itself.

Glasgow Prestwick is Scotland's fifth-busiest airport in terms of passenger traffic, although it is the largest in terms of land area. Passenger traffic peaked at 2.4 million in 2007 following a decade of rapid growth, driven in part by the boom in low-cost carriers, particularly Ryanair, which uses the airport as an operating base. In recent years, passenger traffic has declined; around 670,000 passengers passed through the airport in 2016.

There has been much public debate and speculation over the association of the airport with Glasgow due to the fact Prestwick and Glasgow are considerably far apart. Calls have been made for the airport to be renamed Robert Burns International Airport, however, this was ruled out by the Scottish Government in 2014.

History
Passenger facilities were added in 1938. These were used until further investment made Prestwick compatible with jet transportation. The October 1946 USAAF diagram shows a  runway 14/32, with a  runway 8/26 crossing just west of its midpoint.

A parallel taxiway, link road and an all-new terminal building were opened by the Queen Mother in 1964. The extension of Runway 13/31 caused considerable disruption to road users, for the main road from Monkton into Prestwick now crossed the tarmac of the runway. This was controlled by a "level crossing" system until a new perimeter road was completed.

Commercial use
In 1945, regular transatlantic commercial flights began between Prestwick and New York.

Military use
In the Second World War the RAF controlled trans-Atlantic flights from Prestwick.

Until February 2016 part of the Prestwick site was occupied by the Royal Navy Fleet Air Arm with RNAS Prestwick, officially known by the Royal Navy as HMS Gannet, where a detachment of three Sea Kings provided a search and rescue role, covering one of the largest SAR areas of the UK including Ben Nevis, the Lakes, Northern Ireland and  past the Irish coast. Additionally, Gannet SAR provided a medical evacuation service to the Scottish island communities. Personnel at the base numbered 15 officers, 11 ratings, 28 civil servants and 50 civilian staff. The crews regularly featured as part of the popular Channel 5 documentary series Highland Emergency. 2009 saw the unit break a new record as they were tasked to 447 call-outs, 20% of the UK's total military SAR call outs for 2009 and making them, for the second year in succession, the busiest Search & Rescue base in the UK.

There was controversy over the airport's use in the CIA's extraordinary rendition flights, as aircraft had used the airport as a stop-over point. Since November 2013, when the Scottish government took control of the facility, service contracts have been established with the USAF, USN, USMC, Defense Logistics Agency and National Guard.

Elvis Presley stopover

Glasgow Prestwick Airport is the only place in the United Kingdom where Elvis Presley (who had distant Scottish ancestry) was known to have set foot, when the United States Air Force transport plane carrying him home to the United States stopped to refuel in 1960, en route from Germany.

However, on 21 April 2008, during a BBC Radio 2 interview with Ken Bruce, theatre impresario and chairman of Everton FC, Bill Kenwright, said that Elvis actually spent a day in the UK being shown around London by Tommy Steele in 1958.

1990s

1992 marked the beginning of a renaissance for the struggling airport when purchased by "Canadian entrepreneur" Matthew Hudson in a "dramatic rescue". Hudson initiated the construction of the airport's railway station on the existing Ayrshire Coast Line (Glasgow–Ayr), which runs past the airfield, making it the first Scottish airport with its own railway station. In her book about Prestwick Airport, South Ayrshire councillor Ann Galbraith writes about this tough time in the airport's history, saying that "if it hadn't been for Matthew Hudson the airport wouldn't be here today".

In 1994, Irish budget airline Ryanair opened a route to the airport from Dublin, followed by a second route in 1995 to London Stansted. In 1998, a third route to Paris-Beauvais was introduced and the airport was sold by Hudson to the Scottish transport company Stagecoach Group.

2000s
In 2001, the airport was purchased by Infratil, a New Zealand company and majority owner of Wellington International Airport. Infratil also owned Manston Airport until November 2013. Manston was sold to a shell company owned by Ann Gloag, a co-founder of Stagecoach, Prestwick's previous owner. In April 2005, Infratil completed a major refurbishment of the terminal building, and rebranded the airport using the phrase "pure dead brilliant", taken straight from the Glasgow patter. Some of the rebranding has been controversial, in particular the redecoration of the airport bar. The bar was rebranded in February 2006 with a logo depicting a man in a kilt, unconscious with an empty bottle of whisky.

Despite objections that it promoted the wrong image of Scotland to foreign visitors and embarrassed local travellers, the airport management insisted the logo was "fun and visually stimulating". However, it was removed a matter of weeks after installation, after the South Ayrshire Licensing Board said the logo trivialised excessive drinking. The "pure dead brilliant" branding was removed from the main terminal building in January 2014.

Since 2007, the airport has occasionally been used by the BBC TV programme Top Gear as the location for various stunts and experiments. The best-known stunt was a scene similar to one featured in the film Casino Royale and featured both a Ford Mondeo and a Citroën 2CV parked behind the engines of a Virgin Atlantic Boeing 747-400, in an experiment to investigate whether the thrust from the aircraft's four jet engines really could lift a car off the ground.

The car park and A79 outside the terminal building have been reconstructed to comply with governmental movement and access restrictions mandated in the aftermath of the Glasgow International Airport terrorist attack. According to a 2008 Master Plan, the departure lounge is at capacity and congested during peak operations. The plan proposes "a central pier that provides adequate circulation and waiting space prior to boarding the aircraft" to cope with a continuing increase in passenger departures.

2010s
 
On 8 March 2012, the airport owner Infratil announced that it planned to sell the airfield. The airport remained unsold until October 2013 when the Scottish Government announced it was in negotiations to take the airport back into public ownership. It is expected that the airport will continue to operate as normal and there will be no job losses. Then-Deputy First Minister Nicola Sturgeon told BBC Scotland that work would now begin for "turning Prestwick around and making it a viable enterprise".

On 1 April 2014, the public petition committee at Holyrood heard that The Robert Burns World Federation wished to rename the airport to Robert Burns International Airport. In June 2014, Ryanair announced the relocation of some routes from Prestwick to Glasgow International Airport by October 2014; included among them were flights to Warsaw and Dublin.

In November 2014 Donald Trump signed a partnership agreement with Prestwick making it the Scottish base for all Trump Aviation Operations, in order to service his Trump Turnberry golf resort 20 miles away.

As part of the privatisation of the UK's search and rescue service, Bristow Helicopters based two Sikorsky S-92 helicopters in a new hangar at HMS Gannet. The handover took place in January 2016. In March 2016, the airport revealed new branding and a new look to the inside and outside of the airport building.

In 2015, Glasgow Prestwick Airport was shortlisted as a potential UK Spaceport, as part of the British commercial spaceport competition.

In June 2019, the Scottish government announced that it was putting the airport up for sale. Bidders would be expected to commit to maintaining and developing aviation operations and employment.

2020s
In February 2021, the Scottish government announced that a preferred bidder had been selected to buy the airport. The unnamed bidder was believed to be a European transport infrastructure investor. 

However, the Scottish government announced in December 2021 that the bid had been rejected, and that the sale would not proceed. The airport would consequently remain in public ownership, but the government stated it was committed to "returning it to the private sector at the appropriate time and opportunity." As of January 2023, no private investor has been found yet but there was ongoing debate if the airport is financially viable or will require further loans from the government.

Airlines and destinations

Passenger
The following airlines operate regular scheduled passenger and cargo services to and from Glasgow Prestwick:

Cargo

Statistics

Passengers

Routes

Ground transport

Rail
Prior to the opening of Inverness Airport Railway Station in 2023 Prestwick airport was the only airport in Scotland with its own railway station, Prestwick International Airport railway station, built by the airport in 1994. The station is connected to the terminal by an enclosed walkway over the A79 road, and platforms are accessed by stairs, escalators and lifts. The station building continues to be owned and operated by the Airport, and not by Network Rail or ScotRail. The track through the station itself remains the responsibility of Network Rail.

Ayr Airshow
Prestwick Airport used to host a bi-annual airshow, the first of which was held on 30 September 1967. While very small in scale compared to such shows as RAF Fairford or Farnborough, the Scottish air show attracted up to 100,000 spectators to Prestwick in its heyday in the 1980s.

The revived Scottish Airshow was first held on 6 and 7 September 2014; an air display was held at the Low green at Ayr Seafront and a static display on 7 September at the airport. The event included appearances by the Battle of Britain Memorial Flight, including the only two flying Avro Lancaster bombers, and the last airworthy Avro Vulcan bomber, famous for being part of the UK's Nuclear "V Force" bomber fleet. The second Scottish Airshow was held on 5 and 6 September 2015.

Incidents and accidents
On 28 August 1944, a United States Army Air Forces Douglas C54A Skymaster flying from Boston via Keflavik crashed into houses on the south side of the airport while attempting to land, all 20 crew and passengers as well as five people on the ground were killed. 
 20 October 1948 a Lockheed L-049 Constellation of KLM crashed on approach to Prestwick; all 40 aboard perished.
Early on 25 December 1954, at 0330 hours, a British Overseas Airways Corporation Boeing 377 Stratocruiser crashed on landing at Prestwick, killing 28 of the 36 passengers and crew on board. The aircraft had been en route from London to New York City, when, on approach to Prestwick, it entered a steep descent before levelling out too late and too severely, hitting the ground short of the runway. The crash has been attributed to a number of factors, including: pilot fatigue (the Captain was well over his duty limit due to the aircraft being delayed); the landing lights at Prestwick being out of action due to repair; and the First Officer either not hearing a command from the Captain for landing lights (which might have helped judge the low cloud base) or mistakenly hitting the flaps, causing the aircraft to stall.
On 17 March 1977, a Boeing 707 from British airtours crashed during a pilot training and caught fire. All four crew on board survived.
On 15 June 2013, an EgyptAir flight from Cairo bound for New York JFK Airport was diverted to Prestwick Airport under RAF escort due to a note found on board threatening to 'set the plane on fire'. Roads surrounding the airport were closed as police dealt with the incident.
• On 10 February 2023, a Boeing 767-300 aircraft operated by Delta Air Lines flying from Edinburgh to New York-JFK made an emergency landing after flames were seen shooting from the wing shortly after takeoff, Nobody was injured.

See also
 Orangefield House, South Ayrshire – the former control tower
 Fail Monastery – remains of used as foundations for the airport

Notes

References

Further reading

External links

 Official website
 
 
 The 1938 Palace of Engineering

Aircraft assembly plants in the United Kingdom
Airports established in 1934
1934 establishments in Scotland
Airfields of the United States Army Air Forces Air Transport Command on the North Atlantic Route
Airfields of the United States Army Air Forces in the United Kingdom
Airports in Scotland
Manufacturing plants in Scotland
Prestwick
Public corporations of the Scottish Government
Transport in South Ayrshire
Elvis Presley